Czechoslovakia competed at the 1928 Winter Olympics in St. Moritz, Switzerland.
Rudolf Burkert won the first Czechoslovak medal from the Winter Olympics. Libuše Veselá was the first Czechoslovak woman to take part in the Winter Olympics.

Medalists

Cross-country skiing

Figure skating

Ice hockey

The top team (highlighted) advanced to the medal round.

Nordic combined

Ski jumping

Military patrol (demonstration event)
Team Race
 Czechoslovakia - 4:15:07 (6th place)
 Otakar Německý
 Jan Bedřich
 Josef Klouček
 Robert Möhwald

References

Nations at the 1928 Winter Olympics
1928
Olympics, Winter